John William Cummings (August 25, 1855 – August 28, 1929) was an American lawyer and politician who served in both branches of the Massachusetts legislature, in the Massachusetts Constitutional Convention of 1917,  and as the 14th and 16th Mayor of Fall River, Massachusetts.

See also
 1878 Massachusetts legislature

References

External links
Southern New England Irish; John W. Cummings
Patrick & Catherine (McGlynn) CUMMINGS Family of Providence, Rhode Island and Fall River, Massachusetts

Massachusetts state senators
Members of the Massachusetts House of Representatives
Members of the 1917 Massachusetts Constitutional Convention
Mayors of Fall River, Massachusetts
1855 births
1929 deaths
People from Stockport
English emigrants to the United States